Nukunu (or Nugunu or many other names: see below) is a moribund Australian Aboriginal language spoken by Nukunu people on Yorke Peninsula, South Australia. As of 2017, there is a revival and maintenance programme under way for the language.

Names
This language has been known by many names by neighbouring tribes and Australianists, including:

Nukuna, Nokunna, Noocoona, Nookoona, Nuguna, Nukana, Nukunnu, Nukunu, Njuguna
Doora
Pukunna
Tjura, Tyura
Wallaroo, Warra
Wongaidya (from wangkatya, present tense form of verb 'to speak')

Classification
Nukunu is a Pama–Nyungan language, closely related to neighboring languages in the Miru cluster like Narungga, Kaurna, and Ngadjuri.

Phonology

Vowels
Nukunu has three different vowels with contrastive long and short lengths (a, i, u, a:, i:, u:).

Consonants
The Nukunu consonantal inventory is typical for a Pama–Nyungan language, with six places of articulation for stops and nasals.  There are three rhotics in the language.
 

A phonemic voicing contrast exists in Nukunu, but it has only been observed in the retroflex stop series. An example demonstrating such a contrast intervocalically is kurdi (phlegm, IPA ['kuɖi]) and kurti (quandong, IPA ['kuʈi]).

History
In contrast with other Thura–Yura languages, Nukunu did not partake in either the initial th- lenition before vowels or the lenition of initial k- before vowels.

Notes

References

Thura-Yura languages